The Arado river is a river that originates in the surroundings of Curral do Camalhão, Gerês mountain range, north of the Teixeira valley and flows into the Fafião river after the Cascatas de Fecha be Barjas, parish of Cabril, municipality of Montalegre, district of Vila Real, in the north of Portugal.  It lies within the Peneda-Gerês National Park.

Cávado River